The Bantawa Language (also referred to as An Yüng, Bantaba, Bantawa Dum, Bantawa Yong, Bantawa Yüng, Bontawa, Kirawa Yüng), is a Kiranti language spoken in the eastern Himalayan hills of eastern Nepal by Kirati Bantawa  ethnic groups. They use a syllabic alphabet system known as Kirat Rai script . Among the Khambu or Rai people of  Eastern Nepal, Sikkim, Darjeeling and Kalimpong in India. Bantawa is the largest language spoken. According to the 2001 National Census, at least 1.63% of the Nepal's total population speaks Bantawa. About 370,000 speak Bantawa Language mostly in eastern hilly regions of Nepal (2001).  Although Bantawa is among the more widely used variety of the Bantawa language, it falls in the below-100,000 category of endangered languages. It is experiencing language shift to Nepali, especially in the northern region.

Bantawa is spoken in subject-object-verb order, and has no noun classes or genders.

Dialects

Most of the Bantawa clan are now settled in Bhojpur, Dharan, Illam, and Dhankuta. Recent figures show most of them are settled in Dharan. Bantawa is spoken in the following districts of Nepal (Ethnologue).
Province No. 1: Bhojpur District, Dhankuta District, Ilam District, Jhapa District, Khotang District, Morang District, Okhaldhunga District, Panchthar District, Sunsari District, Taplejung District and Udayapur District
 Sikkim, Darjeeling, Kalimpong of India
Dialects are as follows  (Ethnologue).
 Northern Bantawa (Dilpali)
Northern subdialects: Mangpahang, Raipachha, Awaichha, Rungchenbung and Yangma
 Southern Bantawa (Chewali, Okhreli, Hatuwali, Hangkhim)
Southern and Northern Bantawa, similar, could be united as 'Intermediate Bantawa'.
 Eastern Bantawa (Dhankuta)
Eastern dialect is the most divergent. It is most closely related to Dungmali language, though also related to Puma language, Sampang language, and Chhintange language.
 Western Bantawa (Amchoke, Amchauke)
Amchaucke dialects: Sorung,  Saharaja, Lulam, and Sukita
Wana Bantawa (also called simply Bantawa), spoken by the Bantawa subcaste. The Amchoke dialect is spoken in the Limbu area, especially in Ilam district.

Bantawa is also considered as a superior clan in the Kiranti family.  Bantawa is also reportedly in use as a lingua franca among Rai minorities in Himalayan Sikkim, Darjeeling Kalimpong In India  and Bhutan. Meanwhile, the language is just being introduced in a few schools at the primary level (Year 1- Year 5) using Devanagari script.

The extinct Waling language attested from the late 19th century may have been a variety of Bantawa, or a closely related language, if not the Hatuwali dialect the Waling people speak today.

Bantawa language

Phonology

Vowels

 vowel comes in Bantawa due to influence of Nepali language and it is rarely used like in other Tibetan Burmese language.
nowadays some dialect or in region may pronounce // as []/[] or [].

Consonants

 Glotta stop  is one of the consonants of Bantawa language which is represent by using .
 Dental consonant and Apico-alveolar does not make any difference while speaking.
 To write Bantawa language either Kirat Rai script or Devanagari lipi is being used in Nepal.

References

Further reading
 Winter, Werner. 2003. A Bantawa Dictionary. Trends in Linguistics - Documentation 20. Mouton de Gruyter: New York.
 Doornenbal, Marius. 2009. A Grammar of Bantawa. Leiden University PhD Thesis. LOT Dissertation Series: Utrecht.

External links
 A Grammar of Bantawa
 Bantawa: observations of a threatened language

Kiranti languages
Languages of Nepal
Vulnerable languages
Languages of Koshi Province